Charlie Bailey (born July 20, 1940) is a former American football coach. He was hired as the head football coach at the University of Memphis in December 1985, where he put together a 12–20–1 record. He resigned from Memphis in 1989 after allegations that two of his athletes lied about contacts with school boosters.  In 1993, he moved to the University of Texas at El Paso, where he posted a 19–53–1 record. After the 1999 season, he was replaced by Gary Nord.

Head coaching record

Notes

References

1940 births
Living people
American football defensive linemen
Florida Gators football coaches
Kentucky Wildcats football coaches
Memphis Tigers football coaches
Miami Hurricanes football coaches
Orlando Thunder coaches
Pittsburgh Panthers football coaches
Rice Owls football coaches
Tampa Spartans football coaches
Tampa Spartans football players
United States Football League coaches
UTEP Miners football coaches
Orlando Rage coaches
People from Poca, West Virginia